Victor Pavlyuchenkov (30 April 1963 – 1 February 2021) was a Russian-Soviet actor and stuntman.

Biography
Pavlyuchenkov was born on 30 April 1963. He graduated from the Lunacharsky State Institute for Theatre Arts in 1990 and became a member of the Association of Russian Stuntmen and the Union of Russian Cinematographers. He worked as a screenwriter for television channels such as REN TV, Russia-1, and TV Centre.

Victor Pavlyuchenkov died suddenly on 1 February 2021, at the age of 57. His colleagues have suggested that third parties may have been involved in his death.

Filmography
 (1988)
My Fair Nanny (2006)
 (2008)
 (2008)
 (2008)

References

1963 births
2021 deaths
Russian actors
Russian Academy of Theatre Arts alumni